
Year 316 BC was a year of the pre-Julian Roman calendar. At the time, it was known as the Year of the Consulship of Rutilus and Laenas (or, less frequently, year 438 Ab urbe condita). The denomination 316 BC for this year has been used since the early medieval period, when the Anno Domini calendar era became the prevalent method in Europe for naming years.

Events 
 By place 
 Macedonian Empire 
 Eumenes and Antigonus, rivals to Cassander for control of Macedonia, meet in the Battle of Gabiene in Media to the northeast of Susa. Antigonus defeats Eumenes, with the aid of Seleucus and Peithon (the satraps of Babylonia and Media, respectively). The result is inconclusive. However, some of Eumenes' soldiers take matters into their own hands. Learning that Antigonus has captured many of their wives, children and the cumulative plunder of nearly 40 years of continuous warfare, they secretly open negotiations with Antigonus for their safe return. They hand over Eumenes and his senior officers to Antigonus in return for their baggage and families. Eumenes is put to death by Antigonus after a week's captivity.

 Greece 
 Cassander returns from the Peloponnesus and defeats Macedonia's regent Polyperchon in battle. Cassander blockades Olympias, mother of the late Alexander the Great, in Pydna, where she surrenders. Cassander  takes Roxana and her son Alexander IV of Macedon into his custody.
 Olympias is condemned to death by Cassander, but his soldiers refuse to carry out the sentence. She is eventually killed by relatives of those she has previously had executed.
 Cassander marries Thessaloniki, half-sister of Alexander the Great. He has Alexander's widow, Roxana and son, Alexander IV of Macedon, imprisoned at Amphipolis in Thrace. They are never to be seen alive again.
 Cassander founds, on Pallenê, a city called Cassandreia
 Thebes, which has been destroyed by Alexander the Great, begins to be rebuilt by Cassander with the help of the citizens of Athens.
 In Rhodes (city), a major flood occurs. At least five hundred people die and many houses collapse. 

 Sicily 
 Agathocles, the new tyrant of Syracuse, extends his rule over the eastern part of the island.

 Roman Republic 
 The Romans, with an eye to capturing Apulia, send an army (led by dictator Quintus Fabius Maximus Rullianus) to seize the town of Lucera from the Samnites. They are badly beaten in the Battle of Lautulae and the Samnites go on to reach within 32 kilometres of Rome.

 China 
 King Hui of Qin decides, on the advice of General Sima Cuo, to invade and annex the ancient states of Ba and Shu in Sichuan, in order to increase Qin's agricultural output and obtain a strategic platform from which to defeat the state of Chu.

Births 
 Arsinoe II, Queen of Thrace and later co-ruler of Egypt with her brother and husband Ptolemy II of Egypt (d. 270 BC)

Deaths 
 Olympias, Epirote princess, wife of Macedonian king Philip II and the mother of Alexander the Great (b. c. 376 BC)
 Eumenes, Greek general and diadochi (b. c. (362 BC)
 Antigenes (general), Greek general 
 Eudemus (general), Greek general 
 Sun Bin, Chinese military strategist and general from the State of Qi

References